Jon St. Elwood (born October 24, 1952) is an actor whose film and television career began in the late 1970s and carried on until around the late 1980s. He is familiar to soap opera fans as tough guy Jazz Jackson in the day time soap opera The Young and the Restless, a role he played for a couple of years in the mid-1980s. He also acted in the films, The Child Stealer in 1979, They Call Me Bruce? in 1982 and Against All Odds in 1984.

Personal life
Born on October 24, 1952 and originally from Los Angeles, California, St. Elwood is from Phoenix Arizona. In his younger years, and having the issues that juveniles have, for two years his life was structured under the Gary Job Corps vocational and educational training center which years later in 1986, he attributed to his own development as a person and a Christian. Prior to becoming an actor, he worked in some low paying jobs which included moving rocks and furniture removal. He was also a plumbers mate and a night-club bouncer. He even attended the Phoenix Police Academy for a while, but opted to try medical related work.

In early 1985, he received the Los Angeles Sentinel's Community Service Award for his work with American Cancer Society and some other organizations.

In October 1985, St. Elwood was married to former neighbor and friend Irene Hubbard at the Historical Wedding Chapel in Burbank, California. Prior to their becoming man and wife, he had known her for seven years. Cast members, Stephanie Williams (Who played Amy) and Susan Seaforth Hayes (who played Joanna), with her husband Bill Hayes, attended the small ceremony.

Career

1970s
One of his earliest roles was as Skelly in Mel Damski's 1979 film, The Child Stealer which starred Beau Bridges, Blair Brown and Cristina Raines. Also that year he appeared as Private Reuss in the part 1 of "Good Bye, Radar", from the series M*A*S*H which aired on the 10th of August. He also appeared as Manu in the "Demon's Triangle" episode of A Man Called Sloane which starred Robert Conrad. It aired on October 20, 1979.

1980s
In 1980, he appeared as Darryl in an episode of The White Shadow, "The Stripper". 
He appeared in Tayor Hackford's film Against All Odds which starred  Rachel Ward, Jeff Bridges and Richard Widmark and James Woods. He played the part of Ahmad Cooper in this 1984 film.

He landed an on-going role as Jazz Jackson in Young & the Restless that went from 1983 to 1986.
According to Connie Passalacqua's article in The Northwest Arkansas Times. It was after two months of playing his role that his acting ability impressed the powers at Young & the Restless enough to expand his role.
Elwwood's character as Mob leg breaker, now a bad-guy-turned-good, Jazz Jackson was already established by the time Phil Morris came in to play his brother Tyrone Jackson. The character Jazz who originally got involved with a crime syndicate so he could put younger brother Tyrone through law school, ended up killing mobster Tony DiSalvo would end up working as an operative for PIs, Andy Richards and Paul Williams.

In June, 1985, along with Don Cornelius,  Raymond St. Jacques, Bo Svenson and Melba Moore, he was a presenter at the Ninth Annual BRE awards.

Around 1987, he appeared as T-Bone in "Shades", an episode of Hunter which also featured Frank Silvera.

In addition to acting, St. Elwood had written poetry, some of which were published in magazines.

Filmography

Further reading
 The Seguin Gazette-Enterprise Article: Actor says grab success and don't let go By J Amis Turk

References

External links
 Imdb: Jon St. Elwood

Living people
People from Phoenix, Arizona
People from Los Angeles
American male film actors
American male television actors
American male soap opera actors
20th-century American male actors
African-American male actors
American male poets
1952 births
20th-century African-American people